Vorpommern-Rügen is a district in the north of Mecklenburg-Vorpommern, Germany. It is bounded by (from the west and clockwise) the Baltic Sea and the districts Vorpommern-Greifswald, Mecklenburgische Seenplatte and Rostock. The district seat is the Hanseatic city of Stralsund.

Vorpommern-Rügen is characterized by diverse shore line landscapes with many lagoons, beaches and cliff lines, part of them protected in the Western Pomerania Lagoon Area National Park and in the Jasmund National Park.

The area is also a very popular destination for national and international tourism, including Rügen, the biggest island of Germany, the island of Hiddensee, the Fischland-Darss-Zingst peninsula and its adjacent town of Barth with the Stralsund Barth Airport, the port of Sassnitz and the UNESCO World Heritage city of Stralsund.

The Vorpommern-Rügen district is one of the most popular places for national and international tourism in Germany, thanks to its unique protected nature, good infrastructure, popular resort architecture spas, historical towns and vast beaches at the shores of the Baltic Sea.

History 
Vorpommern-Rügen District was established by merging the former districts of Nordvorpommern and Rügen; along with the former district-free city of Stralsund as part of the local government reform of September 2011. The name of the district was decided by referendum on 4 September 2011. The project name for the district was Nordvorpommern.

Geography

The district has a number of lakes, which include:

Towns and municipalities

References